Babayevo (Babay) is a rural locality (a village) in Kameyevsky Selsoviet, Mishkinsky District, Bashkortostan, Russia. The population was 190 as of 2010. There are 5 streets.

Geography 
Babayevo is located 18 km southeast of Mishkino (the district's administrative centre) by road. Nikolayevka is the nearest rural locality.

References 

Rural localities in Mishkinsky District